Arbab Ghulam Rahim (born 1 January 1957) is a Pakistani politician who served as the Chief Minister of the Government of Sindh from 2004 until 2007.

Early life 

Arbab Ghulam Rahim was born in the Diplo Tehsil of Tharparkar District. Arbab Ghulam Rahim is the youngest of 5 sıblıngs. He was born in a very conservative environment and received his early education ın his village. Then up to 7 grade he studied ın Mirpurkhas, from 8th class he joined the Cadet College Petaro, one of the few reputed ınstıtutıons of the province at that time. After passing out as a House Captain from Cadet College Petaro, he joined Liaquat University of Medical and Health Sciences at Jamshoro to study medicine, but later transferred to Jinnah Sindh Medical University, Karachı. After passing out  from Sindh Medıcal College with a MBBS degree, Arbab contested in the Local government election and was elected as  Nazim ın the Mirpur Khas District.

Political career
He won elections as a Member of National Assembly (MNA) four times, and as Member of the Provincial Assembly (MPA) from his constituency PS-60 (Tharparkar-I) in Tharparkar District several times..

Belonging to the Pakistan Muslim League (Q), Arbab was elected to the Sindh Provincial Assembly during the 2002 general elections from PS-60 constituency defeating Engineer Gianchand Meghwar, and was initially inducted as a provincial minister of sindh for communication. Subsequently, he was elected as the Chief Minister of Sindh in 2004.

After the PML-Q was defeated in the 2008 general elections Arbab Rahim left Pakistan to live in United Arab Emirates in self-imposed exile.

On 27 December 2011, Arbab Ghulam Rahim was first appointed as president of the Pakistan Muslim League (Like-Minded) party which was later renamed to Pakistan Peoples Muslim League in 2013.
Arbab Ghulam Rahim returned to Pakistan on 13 March 2013. He later merged his Pakistan Peoples Muslim League in Pakistan Muslim League (N) in 2013.
Later in October 2013, he quits PML-N and joined Grand Democratic Alliance. He later announced to join Pakistan Tehreek e Insaf on 2 July 2021. On 28 July 2021, he was Special Assistant to the Prime Minister on Sindh Affairs by Imran Khan.

Controversies 
In 2008, he was hit in the head with a shoe by Agha Javed Pathan a supporter of Benazir Bhutto. Arbab rarely goes to the Provincial Assembly, because he accuses the ruling party of trying to disgrace him in the assembly.

References 

 

Chief Ministers of Sindh
1956 births
Cadet College Petaro alumni
Sindhi people
Pakistan Muslim League (N) politicians
Pakistan Peoples Muslim League politicians
Living people
People from Tharparkar District
Government of Shaukat Aziz
Jinnah Sindh Medical University alumni
Sindh MPAs 2002–2007